The Price of Success is a 1925 American silent drama film directed by Tony Gaudio and starring Alice Lake, Lee Shumway, and Gaston Glass.

Plot
As described in a film magazine review, Ellen Harden discovers that her husband George is attracted by the beautiful vamp Ardath Courtney. She invites Ardath to dinner and tells her that she is aware of the intrigue. Ellen rents an apartment for Mrs. Moran, a poor woman ill used by her drunken husband Jimmy. While she is visiting this flat, Ellen is framed by Ardath, who sends George there to see that his wife has an apartment. The husband's suspicions of Ellen's infidelity are cleared when Jimmy Moran appears, furious at Ellen for befriending and aiding his wife. George thrashes him and is reconciled to Ellen.

Cast

References

Bibliography
 Connelly, Robert B. The Silents: Silent Feature Films, 1910-36, Volume 40, Issue 2. December Press, 1998.
 Munden, Kenneth White. The American Film Institute Catalog of Motion Pictures Produced in the United States, Part 1. University of California Press, 1997.

External links
 

1925 films
1925 drama films
1920s English-language films
American silent feature films
Silent American drama films
American black-and-white films
Columbia Pictures films
1920s American films